Laurent Fassotte (born 31 December 1977 in Verviers) is a Belgian former professional football defender who played top-flight football in both Belgium and Cyprus.

External links

1977 births
Living people
Belgian footballers
Association football defenders
Standard Liège players
R.W.D. Molenbeek players
Lierse S.K. players
AEL Limassol players
Enosis Neon Paralimni FC players
Ermis Aradippou FC players
Ayia Napa FC players
Belgian Pro League players
Cypriot First Division players
Cypriot Second Division players
Belgian expatriate footballers
Belgian expatriate sportspeople in Cyprus
Expatriate footballers in Cyprus
People from Verviers
Footballers from Liège Province